Double Bass Blues is a 2019 picture book by Andrea J. Loney and illustrated by Rudy Gutierrez. The book was generally well-reviewed, and it received a 2020 Caldecott Honor.

Background and publication 
The book was published on October 22, 2019.

Plot 
A young musician's journey home is accompanied by numerous sound effects.

Illustrations 
Nicholl Montgomery wrote that it's through the illustrations that we understand Nic's point of view.

Awards and reception 

The book was well reviewed. It received starred reviews from Publishers Weekly The Horn Book Magazine, and Kirkus Reviews

The book received a 2020 Caldecott honor.

References 

2019 children's books
American picture books
Caldecott Honor-winning works